Marie-Claude is a feminine French given name. Notable people with the name include:

Marie-Claude Beaud (born 1946), French museumist
Marie-Claude Bourbonnais, Canadian model
Marie-Claude Bakkal-Lagarde, French archaeologist
Marie-Claude Beaud, French exhibition curator and director of cultural institutions
Marie-Claude Bompart, French politician with MPF
Marie-Claude Jarrot, French politician with Union for a Popular Movement
Marie-Claude Gaudel, French mathematician and computer scientist
Marie-Claude Guigue, French historian
Marie-Claude Monchaux, French children's book writer and illustrator
Marie-Claude Pietragalla, French dancer and choreographer
Marie-Claude Treilhou, French film director
Marie-Claude Vaillant-Couturier, French resistance member

Compound given names
French feminine given names